Make (stylized as Make: or MAKE:) is an American magazine published since June 2019 by Make: Community LLC which focuses on Do It Yourself (DIY) and/or Do It With Others (DIWO) projects involving computers, electronics, metalworking, robotics, woodworking and other disciplines. The magazine is marketed to people who enjoyed making things and features complex projects which can often be completed with cheap materials, including household items. Make is considered "a central organ of the maker movement".

In June 2019, Make magazine's parent company, Maker Media, abruptly shut down the bimonthly magazine due to lack of financial resources. As of June 10, 2019, it was reorganized and had since started publishing new quarterly issues, with volume 70 having shipped in October 2019. Make Magazine is currently published by Make Community LLC.

History and profile
The magazine's first issue was released in February 2005 and then published as a quarterly in the months of February, May, August, and November; as of Fall 2022, 82 issues have been published. It is also available in a digital edition.

The magazine has features and rotating columns, but the emphasis is on step-by-step projects. Each issue also features a Toolbox section with reviews of books and tools. Most volumes had a theme to which the articles in the special section are usually related. Notable previous columnists include Cory Doctorow, Lee D. Zlotoff, Mister Jalopy, and Bruce Sterling. The cartoonist Roy Doty has also contributed to many issues of the magazine.

The Skill Builder section was a frequent feature teaching skills in areas as diverse as welding, electronics, and moldmaking.

Makes founder and publisher is O'Reilly co-founder Dale Dougherty along with Sherry Huss, Vice President Make. The founding editor-in-chief was Mark Frauenfelder. The current editor-in-chief is Keith Hammond.

In Germany, Austria and Switzerland (DACH) the Heise Zeitschriften Verlag was under license to publish a German-language edition of Make independently of the English-language one. Maker Media GmbH produced and published the magazine every other month.

Maker Faire

The magazine launched a public annual event to "celebrate arts, crafts, engineering, science projects and the Do-It-Yourself (DIY) mindset.. Called Maker Faire, the first was held April 22-34, 2006, at the San Mateo Fairgrounds. It included six exposition and workshop pavilions, a  outdoor midway, over 100 exhibiting makers, hands-on workshops, demonstrations, and DIY competitions.

In 2007, Maker Faire was held in the San Francisco Bay Area on May 3-4, and Austin, Texas, on October 20-21. The 2008 Maker Faires occurred May 3-4 at the San Mateo Fairgrounds in San Mateo, California, and October 18-19 at the Travis County Expo Center in Austin, Texas. The 2009 Maker Faire Bay Area was held on May 30-31. In 2010, there were three Maker Faires: Bay Area on May 22-23, Detroit on July 31 and August 1, and New York on September 25-26.

By 2013, there were 100 Maker Faires across the globe, including in China, Japan, Israel, Australia, Spain, the UK, Italy, Ireland, Scotland, Chile, France, Norway, Canada, Germany and the Netherlands, as well as numerous cities in the United States. A total of 93 of these Faires were "Mini" Maker Faires — smaller scale, independently produced, local events.

In 2014, the number of Maker Faires continued to grow, including one hosted by the White House.

In 2017, there were 240+ Maker Faires planned around the world.

MakersMakers (subtitled "All Kinds of People Making Amazing Things in Backyards, Garages, and Basements") is a spin-off hardback book. Based on the magazine section of the same name, it covers DIY projects and profiles their creators.

Craft

2006: Craft spin-out
In October 2006, a spin-off magazine, Craft, was created for art and craft activities, allowing Make to concentrate exclusively on technology and DIY projects.

2009: Craft re-absorbed
On 11 February 2009, e-mails were sent to Craft: subscribers explaining that due to rising production costs and shrinking ad markets, the print version of Craft: would be discontinued but would remain as an online presence. Also, all further printed content would be incorporated into Make.

Make televisionMake television'' was a television show produced by Twin Cities Public Television and hosted by John Edgar Park which premiered in January 2009 on PBS stations. Ten episodes of the show were produced, featuring projects and informational guides as well as user produced videos which were submitted online.

Make Controller Kit
The MAKE Controller Kit''' was an open source hardware solution for hobbyists and professionals to create interactive applications. It supported desktop interfaces via a variety of languages such as Max/MSP, Flash, Processing, Java, Python, Ruby, or anything that supports OSC.

As per Makezine, they helped fuel the idea of creation of a MAKE Controller Kit to better modularize the usage of MAKE controller.

Possibilities include the ability to plug in XBee modules for wireless communication capability. Xbee modules add the power of IEEE 802.15.4 network standard and Zigbee protocol to a MAKE Controller.

See also
 Instructables
 Tim O'Reilly
 Makerspace
 Fab lab

References

External links

 Make magazine
 Make digital edition
 Maker Faire
 Ars Technica review of first issue, by Matt Woodward
 New York Times article about Make from June 2005
 Slate article from March 2005
 Make television, a weekly TV show done in partnership with Twin Cities Public Television
 MakingThings official forum

Quarterly magazines published in the United States
Hobby magazines published in the United States
American educational websites
How-to websites
Open hardware organizations and companies
O'Reilly Media
Magazines established in 2005
Magazines published in California
Robotics magazines
Articles containing video clips
Companies based in Santa Rosa, California
2005 establishments in California
American companies established in 2005